Kirstin Chen is a Singaporean writer.

Biography 
Kirstin Chen was born and raised in Singapore. She moved to the United States at age 15 to attend boarding school, then attended Stanford University, where she earned her Bachelor of Arts. She has a Master of Fine Arts degree from Emerson College. 

She currently lives in San Francisco and teaches creative writing at the University of San Francisco and with Ashland University's low-residency MFA program.

Works 
Chen's first novel was Soy Sauce for Beginners, was an editors pick at O, The Oprah Magazine, the novel tells the story of a young Singaporean Chinese woman living in the United States who returns to Singapore to help the family soy sauce business.

Chen's second novel, Bury What We Cannot Take, published in 2018 by Little A/Amazon Publishing, relates the stories of three generations of a family set against the backdrop of 1950s Maoist China. The novel was named among "best fiction of 2018" by Entropy and "best historical fiction of 2018" by BookBub.

Bibliography 

 Soy Sauce for Beginners, New Harvest, 2014.
 Bury What We Cannot Take, Little A, 2018.
 Counterfeit : a novel, William Morrow, New York, NY, 2022.

References 

Living people
Singaporean writers
Year of birth missing (living people)
Singaporean expatriates in the United States
Emerson College alumni
Ashland University faculty
University of San Francisco faculty
Stanford University alumni